John Mumford may refer to:
 John Mumford (American football) (born 1956), American football coach and former player
 John Mumford (athlete) (1918–1999), Australian athlete
 John B. Mumford, US deputy assistant secretary of labor, convicted along with Cortes Wesley Randell, for selling unregistered securities